The silky mouse (Pseudomys apodemoides) is a species of rodent in the family Muridae. It is found only in Australia.

Description 

The body and head of silky mice tend to be between 65-80 millimeters, with their tail length ranging from 90-110 millimeters. They tend to weigh between 16-22 grams. They have light brown and grey fur on their backs, and white fur on their bellies.

Habitat 

Silky mice are native to Australia, specifically south-eastern Australia (western Victoria). They live in sandy heathlands near plants such as banksias, tea-trees, broombush and mallee eucalypts, which they use to shelter the entrance to their burrows. These mice will dig complex burrows about 2 cm in diameter with multiple tunnels and chambers.  In order to support their heavily herbivorous diet, they need a high plant diversity in their habitat consisting of plants which will bloom and bear fruit throughout the entire year. Silky mice are negatively affected by intensely high temperatures and water shortages.

Behavior and Ecology 
Silky mice are nocturnal creatures that rest in their burrows during the day, and go searching for seeds, nectar, flowers, and fruit at night. While they are primarily herbivores, silky mice sometimes consume cockroaches in the winter in order to supplement their diet. Silky mice are able to breed anytime throughout the year, but usually do so when food conditions are favorable. They tend to have two to five young per litter and they are able to birth successive litters. The Silky mouse tends to live up to two years.

Endangerment 
Many pieces of environmental legislation has been passed to preserve the species, such as the Threatened Species Conservation Act (1995), the Environmental Protection and Biodiversity Conservation Act (1999), the National Parks and Wildlife Act (1974), the Environmental Planning and Assessment Act (1979), and the Native Vegetation Conservation Act (1998). One of the largest threats to the silky mouse population is the destruction of habitat, from both human building and from damage to regional flora due to fires. However, the population has been on a rebound and it is no longer considered endangered, but threatened because it lives in such a specific area.

References

Pseudomys
Mammals of South Australia
Mammals of New South Wales
Mammals of Victoria (Australia)
Rodents of Australia
Mammals described in 1932
Taxonomy articles created by Polbot